21 Pashons - Coptic calendar - 23 Pashons

Fixed commemorations
All fixed commemorations below are observed on 22 Pashons (30 May) by the Coptic Orthodox Church.

Saints
 Saint Andronicus

References
Coptic Synexarion

Days of the Coptic calendar